Sondor (possibly from Aymara sunturu square (house) without a ridge, Quechua suntur circular, is a mountain in the Andes of Peru, about  high. It is located in the Apurímac Region, Abancay Province, Circa District, and in the Antabamba Province, El Oro District. It lies southeast of a mountain named Sunturu.

References

Mountains of Peru
Mountains of Apurímac Region